The 2016 United States House of Representatives elections in Arkansas were held on Tuesday, November 8, 2016 to elect the four U.S. representatives from the state of Arkansas, one from each of the state's four congressional districts. The elections coincided with the elections of other federal and state offices, including President of the United States. The primaries were held on March 1.

Although Libertarian Party presidential candidate Gary Johnson only obtained 2.6% of the vote in Arkansas during the coinciding presidential election, Libertarian candidates for the U.S. House amounted to a total of 18.4% of the popular vote, a 10.4% swing from 2014 when the total was 8%. This huge swing was attributed to several factors:
 the Libertarian Party was the only third party to file for ballot status in the House elections;
 the Democratic Party did not field any candidates for races in the 1st, 3rd, and 4th congressional districts;
 this in turn allowing the Libertarian candidates to obtain over 20% of the vote in these races.

The Democratic Party as a result finished 3rd in the popular vote in Arkansas, with its vote total amounting to 10.4%.

District 1

Rick Crawford, the incumbent representative and member of the Republican Party, ran for reelection.

Mark West was the Libertarian nominee.

There was no Democratic nominee for this election.

General election

Results

District 2

Republican French Hill, the incumbent representative, ran for reelection.

Dianne Curry of the Democratic Party, a former member of the Little Rock School Board and the Arkansas Division of Volunteerism, challenged Hill.

Chris Hayes, the Libertarian nominee for this seat in 2012 and for Arkansas State Treasurer in 2014, was the Libertarian nominee.

Republican primary

General election

Results

District 3

Republican Steve Womack ran for reelection.

Nathan LaFrance, the Libertarian nominee for U.S. Senate in 2014, was the Libertarian nominee.

There was no Democratic nominee for this election for the third consecutive time in Arkansas's third congressional district (including redistricting).

General election

Results

District 4

Republican Bruce Westerman ran for reelection.

Kerry Hicks was the Libertarian nominee.

There was no Democratic nominee for this election.

General election

Results

See also
 United States House of Representatives elections, 2016
 United States elections, 2016

References

Arkansas
2016
United States House of Representatives